The Government Polytechnic, Nashik is a public polytechnic college in Nashik, Maharashtra, India. It is an autonomous institution run by the Government of Maharashtra and offers diploma, post diploma and certificate programs in engineering & technology. The college is accredited by the All India Council for Technical Education (AICTE) and affiliated with the Maharashtra State Board of Technical Education (MSBTE). It is also a member of Indian Society for Technical Education (ISTE).

Programs Offered
Full Time Diploma Program (3-year):

Mechanical Engineering
Electrical Engineering
Civil Engineering
Plastic Engineering
Computer Engineering
Automobile Engineering
Electronics & Telecommunication Engineering
Information Technology
Dress Designing & Garment Manufacturing
Interior designing & decoration (2-year)

Part Time Certificate Courses (1-year):

PGD in IT
Short term Course in IT
Certificate Course in IT
System Analysis & Applications

External links
Official website

Universities and colleges in Maharashtra
Education in Nashik